R2T may refer to:
 Race to the Top, an education initiative announced in 2009 by Secretary Arne Duncan
 Remember Two Things, the 1993 album by the Dave Matthews Band